Pickard China is an American porcelain decorating and manufacturing company in Antioch, Illinois, United States. The company was founded in 1893, and continues to produce ceramic tableware and art ware today.

History
Pickard China was incorporated in Edgerton, Wisconsin, in 1893. Wilder Austin Pickard (1857–1939) started the company in 1894 by offering his customers hand-painted giftware, artware, and eventually dinnerware. He moved the company to Chicago in 1897. The company was originally called Pickard China Studio and it specialized in hand-decorating dessert and tea sets.

Pickard assembled a group of men and women china painters, many emigrating from Europe, to create this uniquely American style of hand-painted china. Many of the original artists were from the Art Institute of Chicago. At first all the porcelain was manufactured in Europe. Pickard would import the blank plates and decorate them in their studio.

Wilder Pickard's son Austin Pickard began to work at the company and made the decision to begin manufacturing the blank plates and dishes themselves. In 1930 the first experimental china was made. Pickard also worked on making its own glazes. In 1937, after the experimentation was complete, a production facility was opened in Antioch, Illinois.

Austin's son, Henry A. Pickard, aka Pete Pickard, was the third generation to enter the family business and served as president from 1966 until his retirement in 1994. Pete's brother-in-law, Eben C. Morgan II, succeeded him as the president of the corporation and remained until shortly before his death in June 2008. Richard E. Morgan and Andrew Pickard Morgan, the founder's great grandsons, both joined the company and represent the fourth generation of the family in the business.

Pickard, Inc., remains a family-owned business. The company's sales are primarily in fine china dinnerware, decorative accessories and collectibles.

Official sets

In 1977, Pickard was selected by the U.S. Department of State to manufacture the official service of china used by American embassies and other diplomatic missions around the world. The special decoration has an embossed gold border of stars and stripes and an embossed reproduction of the Great Seal of the United States. Pickard was also selected to produce exclusive fine china services for heads of state, corporations, and hotels, including the King of Saudi Arabia, Hilton Hotels, Sheraton Hotels and Resorts, Marriott Corporation, General Motors, the U.S. Air Force, New York's Gracie Mansion, the United Nations, Air Force One, Blair House and Camp David.

The 3,520-piece Obama State China service was introduced on April 27, 2015.

References

Sources

 Reed, Alan B. (1995) Collector's Encyclopedia of Pickard China: With Additional Sections on All Chicago China Studios. Collector Books, Paducah, Kentucky. 
 Platt, Dorothy Pickard. (1970) The Story of Pickard China. Everybodys Press, Inc.

External links

Pickard Collectors Club

Porcelain of the United States
Kitchenware brands
Manufacturing companies based in Illinois
Ceramics manufacturers of the United States
American companies established in 1893
Manufacturing companies established in 1893
1893 establishments in Illinois